Highgate, West Midlands may refer to:

Highgate, Birmingham
Highgate, Walsall